Elizabeth Cooper may also refer to:

Elizabeth Cooper (dramatist) (1698?–1761?), British actress, playwright and editor
Elizabeth Priscilla Cooper (1816–1889), daughter in law of John Tyler, President of the United States
Elizabeth Cooper (historian) (fl. 1865–1874), English historian and biographer
Elizabeth Cooper (1914–1960), actress and mistress of General Douglas MacArthur
Betty Cooper, fictional character of Archie Comics

See also
Cooper (surname)